Rubidium peroxide is rubidium's peroxide with the chemical formula Rb2O2.

Production 
Rubidium peroxide can be produced by rapidly oxidizing rubidium in liquid ammonia at −50°C.

It can also produced by pyrolysis of rubidium superoxide in vacuum.

Properties 
Rubidium peroxide is a colourless to light yellow solid with the orthorhombic crystal structure.

References 

Rubidium compounds
Peroxides